Victor Tungilik was an Inuit religious figure who was both a Christian and a traditional angakkuq (spiritual healer) of Anglican parents. Tungilik later eschewed his angakkuq practices and moved to Naujaat.

References

Inuit spiritual healers
People from Naujaat
Inuit from the Northwest Territories
Canadian Anglicans